Nell is a feminine given name and also a surname.

Nell may also refer to:

 Nell (artist) (born 1975), Australian artist
 Nell (band), a South Korean alternative rock band
 Nell (film), a 1994 drama starring Jodie Foster
 Nell, Kentucky, a small town in the United States
 Nell Island, in the Kwajalein Atoll of the Marshall Islands
 Never-Ending Language Learning, a semantic machine learning system
 "Nell", the Allied reporting name for the Japanese World War II Mitsubishi G3M bomber
 "Nell", the name of Robert Goddard's first successful liquid-fuel rocket

See also
 Nell Gwyn (disambiguation)
 Nelle